Crime Stoppers International Foundation or CSI Foundation (CSI) is an umbrella organization that aims to spread the Crime Stoppers program in countries around the world. Crime Stoppers is a program designed to utilize the media and other resources to entice information from the public that can facilitate police investigations. CSI is run by a volunteer board and its activities include hosting annual training conferences and supporting regional leadership and training programs. CSI coordinates networking resources for local Crime Stoppers' operations, such as a website and a print publications called The Caller. It is funded by dues paid by member organizations. Some of the services CSI provides to its members include an annual awards program for local Crime Stoppers operations, produces an operations manual to assist new programs and to help set up and guide new Crime Stopper programs, and providing legal services to its members.

CSI lists its mission statement as the following: "To develop Crime Stoppers as an effective crime-solving organization throughout the world, with the primary objective of the tri-partite organization, Community, Media and Law Enforcement, being, Working Together to Solve Crime".

The Crime Stoppers program began in the 1970s as an innovation to solve a crime that was committed with no witnesses and few leads for police investigators. The main goal is to produce televised re-enactments, offer rewards and promises of anonymity for information leading to an arrest. Detective Greg MacAleese was investigating the murder of a gas station attendant, Michael Carmen, in Albuquerque, New Mexico in 1976 when he came up with the idea. At the time, Albuquerque had one of the highest per capita crime rates in the US. Its crime rate has since improved.

Crime Stoppers Canada
In Canada, a Supreme Court of Canada decision R. v . Leipert, [1997] 1 S.C.R. 281 ruled unanimously that police do not have to disclose any information they receive from this internationally recognized crime prevention program.
     

Thus a phone number was developed, 705-497-5555

Crime Stoppers Barbados
In 2009, it was revealed that information from Crime Stoppers had resulted in 18 arrests, 34 charges and 23 cases cleared for the year. One of Barbados' leading newspapers additionally reported that Crime Stoppers Barbados Inc. was to-date the fastest growing of the worldwide organisations belonging to the group. Tony Phillips, as Chairman of the local unit stated that "Over 90 per cent of the tips have been useful . . . [and] the success ratio is well documented by the police force." Regarding the local unit, Philips further maintained, "They [Crime Stoppers] have never seen one of the organisations develop as quickly as we have, and I think that it is a significant achievement. Tips have been on or above average for a Crimestoppers International, exceeding 50 per month, which is the average for international organisations," he stated.

Crime Stoppers Guatemala 
In Guatemala Crime Stoppers signed an agreement with the Ministry of the Interior (Governance) and operates tupista.gt, a website collecting anonymous tips. Salvador Paiz, the president of Crime Stoppers in that country is a member of a well known family of business owners in that country. In 2018, together with other business leaders, he admitted to illegally financing a political party. Charges were only dropped after the investigating body was cancelled by the president of the political party he funded in part.

See also
 Crime Stoppers
 Crime Stoppers USA

References

External links
Crime Stoppers International
CrimeStoppers Australia
CrimeStoppers Bahamas
CrimeStoppers Belize
Canadian Crime Stoppers Web Site
CrimeStoppers Trinidad & Tobago
Tu Pista (Crime Stoppers Guatemala)

International law enforcement organizations
Companies based in Austin, Texas
Non-profit organizations based in Texas
 

no:Crime Stoppers